Geoff Lewis (born 21 December 1935) is a Welsh retired jockey who was born in Talgarth, Breconshire.

He moved to London with his family (he was one of thirteen children) in 1946. After initially working as a hotel page boy, he started his racing career as an apprentice with Ron Smyth, who was a trainer in Epsom. He will be best remembered as the jockey who won the 1,000 Guineas, 2,000 Guineas, Epsom Oaks (twice), Coronation Cup, and Prix de l'Arc de Triomphe. Most watchers of the sport of horse racing would consider that his greatest moment came in 1971 when he rode Mill Reef to win The Derby. He was regarded as one of Europe's leading jockeys between 1953 and 1979.

Geoff Lewis retired as a jockey in 1979, after which he applied for a trainer's licence and began to train at Thirty Acre Barn, near Epsom racecourse. He trained almost 500 winners before his retirement to Spain in 1999. In 2014 he moved back to Cranleigh, to be near his daughter in Ewhurst.

Major wins 
 Great Britain
1,000 Guineas Stakes - Mysterious (1973)
2,000 Guineas Stakes - Right Tack (1969)
Ascot Gold Cup - Random Shot (1971)
Champion Stakes - (2) - Silly Season (1965), Lorenzaccio (1970)
Coronation Cup - (2) - Lupe (1971), Mill Reef (1972)
Coronation Stakes - (2) - St Lucia (1958), Magic Flute (1971)
Epsom Derby - Mill Reef (1971)
Epsom Oaks - (2) - Altesse Royale (1971), Mysterious (1973)
Dewhurst Stakes - (2) - Silly Season (1964), Mill Reef (1970)
Eclipse Stakes - Mill Reef (1971)
Haydock Sprint Cup - Double Form (1979)
International Stakes - Moulton (1973)
July Cup - Secret Step (1963)
King George VI and Queen Elizabeth Stakes - Mill Reef (1971)
Lockinge Stakes - (2) - Silly Season (1966), Welsh Pageant (1971)
Sun Chariot Stakes - Hill Circus (1971)
Sussex Stakes - Jimmy Reppin (1969)
Yorkshire Oaks - Mysterious (1973)

 France
Prix de l'Arc de Triomphe - Mill Reef (1971)
Prix Ganay - Mill Reef (1972)
Danish Derby - Eminent (1966)

References

Bibliography

External links
BBC bio 

Sportspeople from Powys
Welsh jockeys
British racehorse trainers
1935 births
Living people